Sir Henry Norman Rae (20 January 1860 – 31 December 1928) was an English wool merchant and Liberal Party politician.

Family and education
Rae was the son of a Congregational Minister, the Reverend James Rae  from Harrogate in North Yorkshire. He was educated at Batley Grammar School and later attended Silcoates, a Congregationalist School near Wakefield where his father was a school governor and also spent some time at a boarding school, Highbury House at St Leonards-on-Sea.  In 1883 he married Emily Cass from Mirfield. His wife died in 1927. They had one son and one daughter.

Career
Rae went into the wool business and set up as a merchant in that trade  at Harrogate.  He was the principal in the firm of Pickles and Rae, wool combers and top makers in Bradford.

Politics
From 1904 until 1913, Rae represented the Pateley Bridge division on the West Riding County Council.

Through this association with the area, Rae first stood for Parliament in the December 1910 general election contesting the constituency of Ripon for the Liberals. Although he cut the majority of the sitting Unionist MP Edward Wood (later Lord Halifax), he was not elected.

In 1918 Rae was adopted as the Coalition Liberal candidate for the Shipley Division in the West Riding of Yorkshire. As the official Coalition candidate he stood as a supporter of the Coalition government of Prime Minister David Lloyd George. As the government candidate, he was not opposed by Lloyd George's Conservative partners in the Coalition and was awarded the Coalition coupon. In a straight fight with a Labour opponent, Tom Snowden,  who later became Labour MP for Accrington, Rae won with a majority of 11,010 votes.

Rae was re-elected as MP for Shipley at the 1922 general election as a National Liberal, i.e. a continuing supporter of Lloyd George but this time in a much tighter contest. He was still not opposed by the Tories but he did face a strong Labour challenge from William Mackinder and also from an Asquithian Independent Liberal, Mr A Davy. Rae's majority over Labour was reduced to 1,041 votes.

Rae was knighted in 1922  but chose not to contest any further Parliamentary elections. At the 1923 general election William Mackinder gained Shipley for Labour.

Philanthropy
Rae donated large sums of money to various good causes. He gave £12,000 for university scholarships to a number of schools in the West Riding of Yorkshire  - including some monies set aside for female students - and donated large sums to his old school Batley Grammar. He also gave £10,000 for a private hospital at Shipley for the care of people of limited financial means. In addition, in association with Mr J E Sharman (1869 in Halifax, West Yorkshire to John Sharman and Jane Ann Earl - 26 Nov 1928 in Rossett Manor), he purchased for the public Oakwell Hall, an Elizabethan Manor House at Birstall near Leeds with connections to Charlotte Brontë.

Death
Rae had a history of heart trouble and on 31 December 1928 in Batley, while he was taking tea with a lady to whom he recently become engaged to be married, he collapsed and died   at the age of 68 years.

References

Further reading
G Shuttleworth & M Walker, Sir H Norman Rae: our local benefactor; Moorhead Press, Shipley, 2000

External links 
 

1860 births
1928 deaths
People educated at Batley Grammar School
Liberal Party (UK) MPs for English constituencies
UK MPs 1918–1922
UK MPs 1922–1923
Politics of West Yorkshire
People educated at Silcoates School
Knights Bachelor
National Liberal Party (UK, 1922) politicians
Members of West Riding County Council